Count of Cabra is a Spanish noble title created by King Henry IV of Castile on 2 November 1455 for Diego Fernandez de Cordova and Montemayor, 1st Viscount of Iznájar. 
The titleholder is a Grandee of Spain, the third oldest such title in Spain.

The name refers to the Andalusian municipality of Cabra in the province of Córdoba. The title is carried by the head of the House of Cabra.

Count of Cabra before 1455 

Prior to the concession of the countship of Cabra to Diego Fernández de Córdoba and Montemayor, Henry II of Castile had granted the title to Henry of Castile (1380–1404), his natural son with Juana de Sousa of Córdoba, who died without descendants as the  1st Duke of Medina Sidonia.

Counts of Cabra from 1455

Notes

Sources

Counts of Spain